Hansruedi Roth (born 27 July 1942) is a Swiss luger. He competed in the men's doubles event at the 1964 Winter Olympics.

References

1942 births
Living people
Swiss male lugers
Olympic lugers of Switzerland
Lugers at the 1964 Winter Olympics
Place of birth missing (living people)